Royal Air Force Bowmore or more simply RAF Bowmore is a former Royal Air Force seaplane station located in Bowmore, Argyll and Bute, Scotland.

The following units were here at some point:
 No. 119 Squadron RAF reformed here on 13 March 1941 and operated Short S.26M and Short S.23M, Consolidated PBY Catalina IB until 4 August 1941
 No. 246 Squadron RAF reformed here on 5 August 1942 using Short Sunderland III's until 30 April 1943 when the squadron was disbanded
 No. 422 Squadron RCAF between 8 May 1943 and 3 November 1943 operating Sunderland III's
 ‘G’ Flight was disbanded here on 13 March 1941 and became No. 119 Squadron. The Flight operated S.23 and S.26's.

References

Citations

Bibliography

Bowmore
Islay